Baškovce is a village and municipality in the Sobrance District in the Košice Region of east Slovakia.

Genealogical resources

The records for genealogical research are available at the state archive "Statny Archiv in Presov, Slovakia"Presov, Slovakia"

 Roman Catholic church records (births/marriages/deaths): 1834-1916 (parish B)

See also
 List of municipalities and towns in Slovakia

References

External links
http://en.e-obce.sk/obec/baskovce-kosice/baskovce.html
https://web.archive.org/web/20070427022352/http://www.statistics.sk/mosmis/eng/run.html
Official municipality page
Surnames of living people in Baskovce

Villages and municipalities in Sobrance District